Oscar by the Sea is a riverside private housing residences located at 8 Pung Loi Road, Pak Shing Kok, Clear Water Bay, New Territories, Hong Kong. The residence is jointly developed by Sun Hung Kai Properties and Hong Kong Oxygen. It was designed by MCAA Limited.

The property is divided into 7 buildings with 40 to 59 floors and a total of 1959 units. The estate was opened for sale in 2001 on 27 July 2001 (Phase 1), 1 June 2002 (Phase 2). The management company is Hong Yip Service Co. Ltd. under Sun Hung Kai Properties. Oscar by the Sea is the only private housing estate in Tseung Kwan O that is not built on reclaimed land.

References

External links

 Oscar by the Sea

Private housing estates in Hong Kong
Clear Water Bay
Residential buildings completed in 2002
Sun Hung Kai Properties
2002 establishments in Hong Kong